Mark Walter is an American businessman and the chief executive officer of Guggenheim Partners, a privately held global financial services firm with more than $325 billion in assets under management and headquarters in Chicago and New York.  He is also the part-owner and chairman of the Major League Baseball franchise Los Angeles Dodgers and co-owner of Premier League club Chelsea F.C.

Biography
Walter is a Cedar Rapids, Iowa, native and graduate of Cedar Rapids Jefferson High School. He attended Creighton University before earning his Juris Doctor degree at Northwestern University. In 1996, he co-founded the Liberty Hampshire Company, LLC with Steven E. Johnson, in Chicago. In 2000, he helped found Guggenheim Partners, LLC. Today, he is the chief executive officer of Guggenheim Partners, which has rapidly grown into a global, diversified financial services firm with more than $260 billion in assets under management, 2,300 employees, and 25 offices in six countries around the world.

On May 1, 2012, Walter helped lead Guggenheim Baseball Management, LLC, a private partnership formed in 2011 to acquire the Los Angeles Dodgers, in the successful purchase of the storied baseball franchise for $2.15 billion. His partners in Guggenheim Baseball Management include Peter Guber, Earvin “Magic” Johnson, Stan Kasten, Todd Boehly, and Bobby Patton. Billie Jean King and her partner Ilana Kloss joined the Los Angeles Dodgers ownership group in 2018.  Entrepreneurs Alan Smolinisky and Robert L. Plummer joined the ownership group in September 2019.

On December 10, 2012, in its annual survey of the "50 Most Influential People in Sports Business," the SportsBusiness Journal named Walter the 8th most influential person in sports business due to the historic Dodgers purchase.

According to Forbes, Walter has personal stakes in Beyond Meat and Carvana. In 2021, it was reported that Walter had purchased numerous commercial and historic buildings in Crested Butte, Colorado for an unknown purpose.

Walter also serves as a trustee or director of several organizations including the Solomon R. Guggenheim Foundation, which is named after the Guggenheim family, Northwestern University and the Field Museum. In 2011, Walter made a $30,800 contribution to the Democratic National Committee, as well as a $5,000 contribution to Obama for America.

Walter and several of his partners also bought the Los Angeles Sparks basketball team in 2014.

He later joined the bid led by his partner Boehly to buy the English football club Chelsea in April 2022.

See also
 White Oak Conservation

References

External links
LA Times profile
Guggenheim Partners

Living people
American chief executives of financial services companies
1960 births
Los Angeles Dodgers executives
Los Angeles Dodgers owners
Major League Baseball executives
Chelsea F.C. chairmen and investors